This is a list of federal leaders after Confederation who were members of federal conservative parties.

Tory leaders since Confederation 
This a list of leaders of the Conservative Party of Canada (historical) (1867–1942), Progressive Conservative Party of Canada (1942–2003), and Conservative Party of Canada (2003–present) ("the Tory parties"), and of prime ministers of Canada after Confederation who were members of those parties.

Conservative (1867–1942)

Progressive Conservative Party of Canada (1942–2003)

Conservative Party of Canada (2003–present)

Tory prime ministers of Canada 
This a list of prime ministers of Canada after Confederation who were members of the "Tory parties": the Conservative Party of Canada (historical) (1867–1942), Progressive Conservative Party of Canada (1942–2003), and Conservative Party of Canada (2003–present).

Conservative (1867–1942) 

 Sir John A. Macdonald (1867–1873, 1878–1891)
 Sir John Abbott (1891–1892)
 Sir John Sparrow David Thompson (1892–1894)
 Sir Mackenzie Bowell (1894–1896)
 Sir Charles Tupper (1896)
 Sir Robert Borden (1911–1920)
Arthur Meighen (1920–1921, 1926)
R. B. Bennett (1930–1935)

Progressive Conservative Party of Canada (1942–2003) 

John Diefenbaker (1957–1963)
Joe Clark (1979–1980)
Brian Mulroney (1984–1993)
Kim Campbell (1993)

Conservative Party of Canada (2003–present) 
 
Stephen Harper (2006–2015)

Electoral performance of Tory leaders

Conservative (historical; 1867–1942)

Progressive Conservative Party of Canada (1942–2003)

Conservative Party of Canada (2003–present)

Other conservative parties' leaders

Parties that have had representation in the House of Commons

"Reform-Alliance"

Leaders of the Reform Party of Canada 
Preston Manning (October 31, 1987 – March 25, 2000)

Leaders of the Canadian Alliance 
Deborah Grey (March 27, 2000 – July 8, 2000) (interim)
Stockwell Day (July 8, 2000 – December 12, 2001)
John Reynolds (December 12, 2001 – March 20, 2002) (interim)
Stephen Harper (March 20, 2002 – December 7, 2003)

Leaders of the Reconstruction Party of Canada 
Henry Herbert Stevens (1935–1938)

Leaders of the Social Credit Party of Canada 
John Horne Blackmore (1935–1944) (parliamentary leader)
Solon Earl Low (1944–1961)
Robert Thompson (1961–1967)
Alexander Bell Patterson (1967–1968) (interim)
Réal Caouette (1971–1976)
André-Gilles Fortin (1976–1977)
Gilles Caouette (1977–1978) (interim)
Charles-Arthur Gauthier (1978) (interim)
Lorne Reznowski (1978–1979)
Charles-Arthur Gauthier (1979) (interim)
Fabien Roy (1979–1980)
Martin Hattersley (1981–1983)
Ken Sweigard (1983–1986) (interim)
Harvey Lainson (1986–1990)
Ken Campbell (1990–1993)

Parties that have had no representation in the House of Commons

Leaders of the Christian Heritage Party of Canada 
Ed Vanwoudenberg (1987–1991)
Charles Cavilla (1991–1993)
Heather Stilwell (1993–1994) (interim)
Jean Blaquière (1994–1995)
Ron Gray (1995–2008)
Jim Hnatiuk (2008–2014)
David J. Reimer (2014) (interim)
Rod Taylor (2014 – present)

Leaders of the Libertarian Party of Canada 
 Sieg Pedde (1973–1974)
 Charles 'Chuck' Lyall (1974–1976)
 Ron Bailey (1976–1978)
Alex Eaglesham (1978–1979)
Linda Cain (1980–1982)
Neil Reynolds (May 1982 – 1983)
Victor Levis (1983–1987)
Dennis Corrigan (1987–1990)
Stanislaw Tyminski (1990–1991)
George Dance (1991–1993)
Hilliard Cox (May 1993 – 1995)
George Dance (1995–1996)
Vincent Pouliot (May 12, 1996 – April 5, 1997)
Robert Morse (1997)
Jean-Serge Brisson (1997 - May 18, 2008)
Dennis Young (May 18, 2008 - May 2011)
Katrina Chowne (May 2011 – May 2014)
Tim Moen (May 2014 – 2021)
Jacques Boudreau (2021 – present)

Leaders of the Progressive Canadian Party 
Ernie Schreiber (2004–2005) (interim)
Tracy Parsons (2005–2007)
Sinclair Stevens (2007–2016)
Joe Hueglin (2016–2019)

Leaders of the Western Block Party 
Doug Christie (November 30, 2005 – March 11, 2013)
Paul St. Laurent (March 11, 2013 – January 31, 2014)

Leader of the Alliance of the North 
François Bélanger (September 11, 2013 — present)

Leader of the People's Party of Canada

Maxime Bernier (September 14, 2018 – present)

References

Notes 
 Created Viscount Bennett following his retirement from office.
 On this occasion, Meighen failed in his attempts to win re-election to the House of Commons, so Hanson remained Leader of the Opposition throughout Meighen's term
 Bracken did not win election to the House of Commons until 1945, so Hanson remained Leader of the Opposition until January 1943, when he was replaced by Gordon Graydon
 On two occasions when Drew was too ill to perform his duties, William Earl Rowe served as Leader of the Opposition
 Michael Starr served as Leader of the Opposition until November 5, 1967, when Stanfield, who had previously been premier of Nova Scotia, won election to Parliament
 Brisson led the party on an interim basis prior to being elected at a delegated convention in 2000.

Conservative
Conservative
 

Conservatism-related lists